Joshua Johnson or Josh Johnson may refer to:


Sports

Baseball
 Josh Johnson (pitcher) (born 1984), Canadian-American baseball player in Major League Baseball
 Josh Johnson (catcher) (1914–1999), American baseball player in Negro league
 Josh Johnson (baseball coach) (born 1986), American baseball coach

Other sports
 Joshua Johnson (footballer, born 1884) (1884–?), English football goalkeeper
 Joshua Johnson (footballer, born 2004), English footballer
 Joshua J. Johnson (born 1976), American sprinter
 Josh Johnson (footballer) (born 1981), Trinidadian football midfielder
 Josh Johnson (quarterback) (born 1986), American football quarterback
 Josh Johnson (cornerback) (born 1990), American football cornerback in the Canadian Football League
 Josh Johnson (running back), American football running back
 Josh Johnson (rugby league) (born 1994), English rugby league soccer-player
 Joshua Johnson (basketball) (born 1992), Ugandan basketball player

Other
 Joshua Caleb Johnson, American child actor
 Joshua Johnson (painter) (1763–1832), American painter
 Joshua Johnson (journalist), American journalist and former host of the NPR program 1A
 Josh Johnson (comedian), American stand-up comedian and writer for The Daily Show